The Nordic pavilion houses the national representation of the Nordic countries Sweden, Norway, and Finland during the Venice Biennale arts festivals.

Background

Organization and building 

The pavilion, designed by Sverre Fehn, was built between 1958 and 1962. The open space was designed to let in light reminiscent of that of Nordic countries. Fredrik Fogh extended the building in 1987.

The cooperation between Finland, Norway and Sweden in Venice was initiated in 1962 after the completion of the Nordic Pavilion. Until 1984, the representation of each country was organized nationally. From 1986 to 2009 the pavilion was commissioned as a whole, with the curatorial responsibility alternating between the collaborating countries.

Between 2011 and 2015, Sweden, Finland, and Norway took turns curating the pavilion alone. In 2017, they began joint curation again.

For the 2022 Biennale, the pavilion is being redesignated as the Sámi pavilion in recognition of the three Indigenous artists selected for the exhibition: Pauliina Feodoroff, Máret Ánne Sara, and Anders Sunna. It is the first time the pavilion has hosted a group of only Sámi artists.

Representation by year

Art 

 1962 — FINLAND: Ahti Lavonen, Kain Tapper, Esko Tirronen; NORWAY: Rolf Nesch, Knut Rumohr; SWEDEN: Siri Derkert, Per Olof Ulltvedt
 1964 — FINLAND: Ina Colliander, Simo Hannula, Pentti Kaskipuro, Laila Pullinen; NORWAY: Hannah Ryggen; SWEDEN: Torsten Andersson, Martin Holmgren, Torsten Renqvist
 1966 — FINLAND: Heikki Häiväoja, Harry Kivijärvi, Sam Vanni; NORWAY: Jakob Weidemann; SWEDEN: Öyvind Fahlström
 1968 — FINLAND: Mauno Hartman, Kimmo Kaivanto, Ahti Lavonen; NORWAY: Gunnar S. Gundersen; SWEDEN: Sivert Lindblom, Arne Jones
 1970 — FINLAND: Juhani Linnovaara; NORWAY: Arnold Haukeland; SWEDEN: Did not participate
 1972 — FINLAND: Harry Kivijärvi, Pentti Lumikangas; NORWAY: Arne Ekeland; SWEDEN: Did not participate
 1976 — FINLAND: Mikko Jalavisto, Tapio Junno, Kimmo Kaivanto, Ulla Rantanen; NORWAY: Boge Berg, Steinar Christensen/Kristian Kvakland, Arvid Pettersen; SWEDEN: ARARAT (Alternative Research in Architecture, Resources, Art and Technology)
 1978 — FINLAND: Olavi Lanu; NORWAY: Frans Widerberg; SWEDEN: Lars Englund
 1980 — FINLAND: Matti Kujasalo; NORWAY: Knut Rose; SWEDEN: Ola Billgren, Jan Håfström
 1982 — FINLAND: Juhana Blomstedt; NORWAY: Synnøve Anker Aurdal; SWEDEN: Ulrik Samuelson
 1984 — FINLAND: Kain Tapper, Carl-Erik Ström; NORWAY: Bendik Riis; SWEDEN: Curt Asker
 1986 — "Techne": Bård Breivik (NO), Marianne Heske (NO), Olli Lyytikäinen (FI), Kjell Ohlin (SE), Erik H. Olson (SE), Silja Rantanen (FI), Carl Fredrik Reuterswärd (SE), Osmo Valtonen (FI) (Curator: Mats B.)
 1988 — Per Inge Bjørlo (NO), Rolf Hanson (SE), Jukka Mäkelä (FI) (Curator: Maaretta Jaukkuri, FI)
 1990 — "Cavén, Barclay, Håfström": Per Barclay (NO), Kari Cavén (FI), Jan Håfström (SE) (Curator: Per Hovdenakk, NO)
 1993 — Jussi Niva (FI), Truls Melin (SE), Bente Stokke (NO) (Curator: Lars Nittve, SE)
 1995 — Eva Løfdahl (SE), Per Maning (NO), Nina Roos (FI) (Curator: Timo Valjakka, FI)
 1997 — "Naturally Artificial": Henrik Håkansson (SE), Mark Dion (US), Marianna Uutininen (FI), Mariko Mori (JP), Sven Påhlsson (NO) (Curator: Jon-Ove Steihaug, NO)
 1999 — "End of a Story": Annika von Hausswolff (SE), Knut Åsdam (NO), Eija-Liisa Ahtila (FI). (Curator: John Peter Nilsson, SE)
 2001 — "The North is Protected": Leif Elggren (SE), Tommi Grönlund/Petteri Nisunen (FI), Carl Michael von Hausswolff (SE), Anders Tomren (NO) (Curators: Grönlund/Nisunen, FI)
 2003 — "Devil-May-Care": Karin Mamma Andersson (SE), Kristina Bræin (NO), Liisa Luonila (FI) (Curators: Anne Karin Jortveit and Andrea Kroksnes, NO)
 2005 — "Sharing Space Dividing Time": Miriam Bäckström and Carsten Höller (SE/DE), Matias Faldbakken (NO) (Curator: Åsa Nacking, SE)
 2007 — "Welfare — Fare Well": Adel Abidin (IQ/FI), Jacob Dahlgren (SE), Lars Ramberg (NO), Toril Goksøyr & Camilla Martens (NO), Sirous Namazi (SE), Maaria Wirkkala FI (Curator: René Block, DE)
 2009 — "The Collectors" (in collaboration with the Danish Pavilion): Elmgreen and Dragset, Klara Lidén (SE), Wolfgang Tillmans (DE) and others (Curators: Elmgreen & Dragset, DK/NO)
 2011 — SWEDEN: Fia Backström, Andreas Eriksson (Curator: Magnus af Petersens)
 2013 — FINLAND: Terike Haapoja (Curators: Mika Elo, Marko Karo, Harri Laakso)
 2015 — NORWAY: Camille Norment (Curator: Katya García-Antón)
 2017 — Siri Aurdal (NO), Nina Canell (SE),  (SE), Jumana Manna (PS),  (FI), and Mika Taanila (FI) (Curator: Mats Stjernstedt. Commissioners: Ann-Sofi Noring, Moderna Museet, Sweden, with Katya García-Antón, OCA – Office for Contemporary Art Norway, Norway, and Raija Koli, Frame Contemporary Art Finland, Finland)

References

Bibliography

Further reading

External links 

 

Finnish art
National pavilions
Norwegian contemporary art
Swedish contemporary art